Azamgarh is a constituency of the Uttar Pradesh Legislative Assembly covering the city of Azamgarh in the Azamgarh district of Uttar Pradesh, India.
  
Azamgarh is one of the 5 assembly constituencies in the Azamgarh Lok Sabha constituency. Since 2008, this assembly constituency is numbered 347 amongst 403 constituencies.

Members of Legislative Assembly

Election results

2022

2017
Samajwadi Party candidate Durga Prasad Yadav won in last Assembly election of 2017 Uttar Pradesh Legislative Elections defeating Bharatiya Janta Party candidate Akhilesh by a margin of 26,262 votes.

References

External links
Official Site of Legislature in Uttar Pradesh
Uttar Pradesh Government website
UP Assembly 
 

Assembly constituencies of Uttar Pradesh
Azamgarh
Politics of Azamgarh district